Manuel Fernando de Azevedo Guedes, known as Guedes (born 2 May 1953) is a former Portuguese football player.

He played 14 seasons and 343 games in the Primeira Liga for Varzim, Braga, Porto, Beira-Mar and Leixões.

Club career
He made his Primeira Liga debut for Porto on 11 September 1972 as a starter in a 0–1 loss to Sporting.

References

1953 births
People from Gondomar, Portugal
Living people
Portuguese footballers
FC Porto players
Primeira Liga players
Leixões S.C. players
S.C. Beira-Mar players
Varzim S.C. players
S.C. Braga players
Gondomar S.C. players
Association football defenders
Sportspeople from Porto District